Multiple EGF-like-domains 10 is a protein that in humans is encoded by the MEGF10 gene.

MEGF10 is a regulator of satellite cell myogenesis and interacts with Notch1 in myoblasts. It has been shown to be the cause of early-onset myopathy, areflexia, respiratory distress and dysphagia.

MEGF10 and MEGF11, have critical roles in the formation of mosaics by two retinal interneuron subtypes, starburst amacrine cells and horizontal cells in mice. These cells are less likely to be near neighbours of the same subtype than would occur by chance, resulting in 'exclusion zones' that separate them. Mosaic arrangements provide a mechanism to distribute each cell type evenly across the retina, ensuring that all parts of the visual field have access to a full set of processing elements.

References

Further reading

External links 
 NCBI gene